The Legislative Assembly of Marche (Assemblea Legislativa delle Marche) is the legislative assembly of Marche. Founded as "Regional Council of Marche", it changed its name into "Legislative Assembly" in 2004.

It was first elected in 1970, when the ordinary regions were instituted, on the basis of the Constitution of Italy of 1948.

Composition
The Council was originally composed of 40 regional councillors. Following the decree-law n. 138 of 13 August 2011, the number of regional councillors was reduced to 30, with an additional seat reserved for the President of the Region.

Political groups
The Legislative Assembly of Marche is currently composed of the following political groups:

See also
Regional council
Politics of Marche
President of Marche

References

External links
Legislative Assembly of Marche

Italian Regional Councils
Marche